Seisen International School (SIS) is an all-girls, Catholic school located in Setagaya, in Tokyo, Japan. Students and faculty from over sixty countries are represented at Seisen, with English being the main language of instruction. It offers the International Baccalaureate Diploma Programme for grades 11 and 12.  It is accredited by the Ministry of Education, Culture, Sports, Science and Technology (Japan), New England Association of Schools and Colleges and the Council of International Schools.  
It teaches Montessori kindergarten (coed, ages 2–6) and grades 1-12 (girls only, ages 6–18).

According to the Good Schools Guide International, "The school is popular and has a good reputation."

According to Anne-Marie De Mejía, Seisen International School provides a specifically Christian orientation in its programmes.

History 
The school was founded in 1949 by Sister María Asunción Lecubarri from the Handmaids of the Sacred Heart of Jesus in response to requests from United States Air Force families seeking an education for their children. The school began as a kindergarten in 1949 with four American students, moved to Gotanda in 1962 with 70 students and added a first grade. By 1970, the school was up to grade 9 and in 1973, a year after Seisen was moved to the present location in Yoga, the school was extended to include Grade 12.

CIS International Schools Directory 2009/10, mentions that Seisen has approximately 700 students from around 60 nations.

Campus overview
There are 35 general classrooms, 3 indoor playrooms, a multipurpose room and a kindergarten hall. The facilities also include three science laboratories (for biology, chemistry, and physics classes), a cafeteria, a drama room, a music room, an art room, a pottery room, a media center, and a computer center which includes a large computer classroom, a smaller, drop-in computer lab which is available both during and after school, and an Information Technology room. The school has an infirmary and a full-time nurse on duty. The facilities also include a convent building and a chapel. In 2013, a new futsal field was added to expand the ever-growing Seisen campus, as well as to provide further opportunities for physical exercise, including PE classes and extracurriculars.

The school’s libraries together have a collection of more than 18,000 volumes and subscribe to 65 periodicals and 6 newspapers. The media center houses filmstrips, records, cassettes, maps, transparencies, and audiovisual equipment.

Sports facilities include tennis courts, three playgrounds, a kindergarten play area (with sandbox and play equipment), and a full-size gymnasium with a locker room. The swimming pool at St. Mary's International School is used for the swimming team.

Notable alumni
Lisa
Hikaru Utada, a popular Japanese pop singer, who later transferred to the American School in Japan.
CL, a popular female Korean pop singer from the group 2ne1.

References

External links 

 
  at the Good Schools Guide International

Christianity in Tokyo
Schools in Japan
International Baccalaureate schools in Japan
Girls' schools in Japan
Catholic secondary schools in Japan
Catholic schools in Japan
Montessori schools
Educational institutions established in 1949
Elementary schools in Japan
1949 establishments in Japan
International schools in Tokyo
Setagaya